The 1879 by-election for the East Cumberland constituency of the United Kingdom Parliament occurred on 25 April 1879.  It was called due to the death of the incumbent Liberal MP, Charles Howard, and won by Liberal candidate George Howard.

References

1879 in England
History of Cumberland
1879 elections in the United Kingdom
By-elections to the Parliament of the United Kingdom in Cumbria constituencies
19th century in Cumberland